The Danish Open (sponsored as the e-Boks Open) was a professional women's tennis tournament played 2010–12 on indoor hard courts in Farum, Denmark north of Copenhagen. The event was affiliated with the Women's Tennis Association (WTA), and is an International-level tournament on the WTA Tour. The tournament may be viewed as a continuation of the ITF event 2008 Nordea Danish Open in Odense. A plan to change surface to red clay in 2012, still played indoors in Farum, was dropped due to the cost.

The tournament was selected to be held in April until at least 2015, however on November 9, 2012, the event was cancelled from the 2013 WTA Tour and replaced by a new tournament Katowice Open held in Katowice, Poland.

Past finals

Singles

Doubles

Notes

References 
2010 Sony Ericsson WTA Tour Calendar (PDF).
CoreTennis: e-boks Danish Open.

External links 
 

 
WTA Tour
ITF Women's World Tennis Tour
Hard court tennis tournaments
Indoor tennis tournaments
Tennis tournaments in Denmark
International sports competitions in Copenhagen
Recurring sporting events established in 2008
Recurring sporting events disestablished in 2012
Defunct tennis tournaments in Europe
Defunct sports competitions in Denmark
2008 establishments in Denmark
2012 disestablishments in Denmark